Tim or Timothy O'Brien may refer to:

Arts and entertainment
 Tim O'Brien (author) (born 1946), American novelist
 Tim O'Brien (illustrator) (born 1964), American artist
 Tim O'Brien (musician) (born 1954), American country and bluegrass singer
 Timothy O'Brien (theatre designer) (1929–2022), British theatre designer

Sports
 Sir Tim O'Brien, 3rd Baronet (1861–1948), Irish-born cricketer
 Tim O'Brien (footballer) (born 1994), Australian rules footballer
 Tim O'Brien (rugby union), head coach of St. Mary's Gaels rugby

Other
 Sir Timothy O'Brien, 1st Baronet (1787–1862), Irish politician and merchant
 Timothy John O'Brien (born 1963), astrophysicist at the University of Manchester
 Tim O'Brien (Connecticut politician) (born 1968), legislator in the Connecticut House of Representatives
 Tim O'Brien (Indiana politician), member of the Indiana House of Representatives
 Timothy O'Brien (endocrinologist), Irish professor
 Timothy L. O'Brien (born 1961), American journalist

See also
 Timothy (given name)
 O'Brien (disambiguation)